Grace Llewellyn (born March 18, 1964) is an American educator, author, and publisher. She is the founder of Lowry House Publishers, founder and director of Not Back To School Camp and The Hive: Self-Directed Learning for Teens.

Biography
Llewellyn was born on 18 March 1964 in Boise, Idaho, United States. 

She completed her B.A. from Carleton College in 1986.

After teaching for three years, Llewellyn came across the work of John Holt, which led her to reconsider her approach to education. 

In 1991, at age 26, she wrote The Teenage Liberation Handbook: How to Quit School and Get a Real Life and Education.

Llewellyn published the Teenage Liberation Handbook through her publishing company, Lowry House Publishers.

Bibliography
 The Teenage Liberation Handbook: How to Quit School and Get a Real Life and Education
 Guerrilla Learning: How to Give Your Kids a Real Education With or Without School (with co-author Amy Silver) 2001
 Real Lives: Eleven Teenagers Who Don't Go to School Tell Their Own Stories 1993, 2005
 Freedom Challenge: African American Homeschoolers 1996

References

External links
 The Not Back To School Camp website.

American education writers
1964 births
Living people
Youth rights people
Writers from Eugene, Oregon
Homeschooling advocates
Advocates of unschooling and homeschooling
Writers from Boise, Idaho
Carleton College alumni
Businesspeople from Eugene, Oregon